Amphipteryx longicaudata was a species of damselfly in family Amphipterygidae. It is endemic to Mexico. Its natural habitats are subtropical or tropical moist montane forests and rivers. It is threatened by habitat loss. It is now a synonym of Amphipteryx agrioides.

Sources

 von Ellenrieder, N. & Paulson, D. 2005.  Amphipteryx longicaudata.   2006 IUCN Red List of Threatened Species.   Downloaded on 9 August 2007.

Calopterygoidea
Endemic insects of Mexico
Insects described in 1991
Taxonomy articles created by Polbot